Jörn Kaplan  (born 15 April 1981) is a German pool player.

Career 
At the 2005 German Open, Kaplin won his first Euro Tour medal, where he reached the semi-finals. In 2006 he won his first German championship in 8-Ball. In 2008, Kaplin, along with partners Benjamin Baier and Marco Tschudi won the German team championships with 22 wins, and 6 losses.

Personal life
Jörn Kaplan married Ina Kaplan in 2012, with one child.

References

External links 
 Player profile on azbilliards.com
 Player profile on the website of Euro Tour

1981 births
German pool players
Living people